Nicolas Marazzi (born 13 July 1981) is a Swiss former professional footballer who played as a midfielder.

He was signed by Yverdon-Sport FC on 3 August 2004. Later, he moved on to FC Lausanne-Sport on 1 July 2008. At the end of the 2012–13 Swiss Super League season, Marazzi left Lausanne-Sport after his contract was not renewed. He joined newly promoted fourth-tier side FC Azzurri 90 in Lausanne.

External links

 

1981 births
Living people
Swiss-Italian people
Swiss men's footballers
Association football midfielders
Switzerland youth international footballers
FC Sion players
Yverdon-Sport FC players
FC Lausanne-Sport players
Swiss Super League players
Swiss Challenge League players